Ōtaki Health Camp was New Zealand's first permanent health camp established in 1932. The camp was based in the North Island town of Otaki, New Zealand. The camp closed in June 2018. Temporary health camps were organised during World War I and through to the 1930s under the guidance of Elizabeth Gunn (paediatrician). The camps were part of the wider health system's attempts in tackling malnutrition. Children would bathe, make their beds, have lessons, swim and exercise and have sunbathing sessions. Children were served several portions of healthy simple food to ensure they returned home in a healthier state than in which they arrived.

History 

The Ōtaki Health Camp was opened in 1932 by a Wellington children's charity, with government support. Entrepreneur and land owner, Byron Brown, gave the land for the children's camp and the first camp buildings went up and remain there today. Its aim was to make city children more healthy and robust. It was sited in Ōtaki so children could benefit from ample sunshine and beach-orientated play. In 1936 a national federation was set up to oversee the operation of all the camps. Funding was received from central government and also from the sale of specially issued postage stamps. By the 1970s funding began to dry up, debt mounted and building facilities became outdated. By the mid-1990s, the camps could afford to take only about half of all children eligible for treatment.

Closure 
The government stepped away from the camps in 2001, handing them over to a new charitable organisation, STAND Children's Services/Tu Maia Whanau which was contracted to Oranga Tamariki. In 2018 the camp closed due to a lack of funding.

Gallery

References

Ōtaki, New Zealand
Health care in New Zealand
Welfare